Brad Wall (born 11 March 1979) is an Australian former alpine skier. He competed at the 2002 Winter Olympics and the 2006 Winter Olympics.

References

External links
 

1979 births
Living people
Australian male alpine skiers
Olympic alpine skiers of Australia
Alpine skiers at the 2002 Winter Olympics
Alpine skiers at the 2006 Winter Olympics
People from Cooma
Sportsmen from New South Wales